Lieutenant Colonel Rafael Pabón Airport is an airport serving the city of Villamontes in the Gran Chaco Province of the Tarija Department of Bolivia.

The Villamontes non-directional beacon (Ident: VTS) is located on the field.

See also

Transport in Bolivia
List of airports in Bolivia

References

External links
Villamontes Airport at OpenStreetMap
Teniente Coronel Rafael Pabón Airport at OurAirports

Teniente Coronel Rafael Pabón Airport at FallingRain

Airports in Tarija Department